Jordan McGhee (born 24 July 1996) is a Scottish professional footballer who plays for Dundee as either a defender or midfielder. He began his career at Heart of Midlothian and had a spell on loan at Middlesbrough. He then spent two years at Falkirk, and was team captain from January 2019 until his departure in the summer of that year.

Club career

Heart of Midlothian
McGhee signed for Heart of Midlothian (Hearts) in 2007, having previously played for Claremont Boys Club. In July 2012, he signed a three-year professional contract, tying him to the club until 2015. A member of the club's under-20 squad McGhee made his first team debut aged 16, on 4 May 2013, coming on as an 86th-minute substitute at Tynecastle in a Scottish Premier League match against St Mirren, replacing Mehdi Taouil in a 3–0 win. The following season on 24 August 2013, in only his second substitute appearance, he scored his first professional goal, an 88th-minute winner in a 2–1 win over Aberdeen in the Scottish Premiership. The following week he made his first start against Inverness Caledonian Thistle, in a 2–0 defeat.

In January 2015, McGhee signed a contract with Hearts that was due to run until the end of the 2016–17 season. Ipswich Town made two offers of around £250,000 for McGhee in August 2015, but these were both rejected by Hearts.

In January 2016 McGhee almost moved to Middlesbrough on loan but the move collapsed after paperwork failed to be completed in time. In July 2016, Middlesbrough returned to sign McGhee on a season-long loan to play in the club's development team.

Falkirk
McGhee moved to Scottish Championship club Falkirk in August 2017 for an undisclosed transfer fee. He made his debut two days later on 2 September 2017, starting at centre-back as his new side defeated Sligo Rovers in the Challenge Cup 2-1. McGhee was named as team captain in January 2019. Despite the team's best efforts, the Bairns were relegated to the Scottish League One at the end of the 2018–19 season.

Dundee
In June 2019, McGhee signed a two-year deal with Dundee, who had been relegated to the Championship the previous season. McGhee became a key figure for the Dark Blues, impressing in a variety of different positions, scoring two important goals in consecutive games, and playing in every game until getting surgery on his hand in February 2020, which sidelined him for a couple of weeks. McGhee would be voted by his teammates as Dundee's Player's Player of the Year at the end of the season. At the beginning of July, McGhee would be announced as team captain.

In his second season with Dundee, McGhee would be employed further up the pitch as a box-to-box midfielder by manager James McPake and would find success in this role. In January 2021, McGhee signed a two-year extension with Dundee, keeping him at the club until 2023. Later that month, McGhee would suffer a torn pectoral muscle that would require surgery and looked likely to have ended his season. He would make his return in April however, having recovered quicker than expected, and started in a game away to Dunfermline Athletic immediately upon returning to the squad. McGhee's return was a big factor in Dundee's upturn in form, and he would score 3 vital goals in the Premiership play-offs to help Dundee gain promotion to the Premiership.

During the 2021–22 season, McGhee would require minor surgery to fix a persistent knee issue, which would sideline him for several weeks. Throughout the season he would return to his usual centre-back role under McPake and Mark McGhee, and play his most games for the club in a single season yet, though this would not be enough to avoid relegation and a return to the Championship.

McGhee would miss the start of the 2022–23 season with an Achilles injury. He would make his first appearance of the season on 20 August 2022, coming off the bench away to Greenock Morton. During the season he would once again be used largely as a midfielder by new manager Gary Bowyer. McGhee would mark his 100th appearance for Dundee with a clean sheet in an away victory over Hamilton Academical.

International career
McGhee earned caps at  under-15, under-16 and under-18 level before earning a call up to the Scotland under-21 squad aged just 17 after some impressive performances for Hearts.

After establishing himself as a regular at centre back alongside Stuart Findlay, he captained the Scotland under-21 side for the first time in a friendly against Switzerland on 18 November 2014 which ended in a 1–1 draw.

Career statistics

Honours
Heart of Midlothian
Scottish Championship: 2014–15

References

External links

1996 births
Living people
Scottish footballers
Scotland youth international footballers
Association football defenders
Heart of Midlothian F.C. players
Scottish Premier League players
Scottish Professional Football League players
Scotland under-21 international footballers
Middlesbrough F.C. players
Falkirk F.C. players
Sportspeople from East Kilbride
Footballers from South Lanarkshire
Dundee F.C. players